The Brownsville Charros were a minor league baseball team that played in the United League Baseball, which is an independent league not affiliated with Minor League Baseball.

The Charros were formed by the league in 2014 to replace the departing Edinburg Roadrunners. They are primarily a travel team that plays most of its games on the road, but they do play some home games at Harlingen Field. The team was originally to be called the Mexico Paisanos, before  a deal was worked out to name them after the original Brownsville Charros. The league folded at the conclusion of the season.

References

External links
 Official website

United League Baseball teams
Defunct independent baseball league teams
Professional baseball teams in Texas
2014 establishments in Texas
Baseball teams established in 2014
2014 disestablishments in Texas
Baseball teams disestablished in 2014
Defunct baseball teams in Texas